Elena Baltacha was the defending champion, but chose to participate at the 2012 Birmingham Classic instead.
Ashleigh Barty won the title, defeating Tatjana Malek in the final 6–1, 6–1.

Seeds

Draw

Finals

Top half

Bottom half

References
 Main Draw
 Qualifying Draw

Nottingham Challenge - Singles
2012 Women's Singles